This is a list of electricity-generating power stations in the U.S. state of Indiana, sorted by type and name. In 2019, Indiana had a total summer capacity of 26,665 MW through all of its power plants, and a net generation of 102,505 GWh.  The corresponding electrical energy generation mix was 59.3% coal, 33.5% natural gas, 6.1% wind, 0.4% biomass, 0.3% hydroelectric, 0.3% solar, and 0.1% petroleum.

Coal-fired

1 Also includes cooling towers.
0 Active Units indicates Decommissioned Stations.

Coal gasification

1 The existing plant will be decommissioned and demolished upon completion of new IGCC facility.

Oil fired peaking stations
Connersville Peaking Station
Miami-Wabash County Peaking Station
Wheatland Peaking Station

Natural gas fired

Hydroelectric dams
Markland Locks and Dam
Norway Dam (Indiana)
Oakdale Dam (Indiana)
Twin Branch Dam (Indiana)
Elkhart Dam (Indiana)

Wind farms

Solar

Biomass to energy plant
Milltown Biomass

Attempted nuclear plants
Marble Hill Nuclear Power Plant
Bailly Nuclear Power Plant

Operating electrical utility companies
Duke Energy Indiana (Formerly Public Service Indiana (PSI))
Hoosier Energy
Indiana-Michigan Power
AES Indiana, a subsidiary of AES Corporation
Northern Indiana Public Service Company (NIPSCO) (a subsidiary of NiSource)
Vectren (Formerly Southern Indiana Gas & Electric Company (SIGECO))

References

External links
Existing coal plants in Indiana at SourceWatch

 
Power stations
Indiana